Jarrod Taylor (born 15 February 2001) is a South African professional rugby union player for the  in the Currie Cup. His regular position is flanker.

Taylor was named in the  side for the 2022 Currie Cup Premier Division.

References

South African rugby union players
Rugby union flankers
Western Province (rugby union) players
2001 births
Living people